The Mukura Forest Reserve is a protected reserve in the northwest part of Rwanda, covering about 16 km Mukura Forest is situated in western Rwanda's Albertine Rift region, which lies in the Congo-Nile crest. Once part of a swath of mountain forest that extended all the way from Nyungwe to the Volcanoes Park, the Mukura is now an isolated chunk of forest.

Mukura was designated a reserve in 1951. It originally covered an area of 30,000 hectares. However, nearly half of the total forest cover and biodiversity has been lost since, leaving the forest with an area of only 16,000 hectares. A host of factors have led to this decline, including a population density of nearly 600 people per km and a mean local household income of $3/month, the latter causing inhabitants to exploit the forest for financial solvency.

The annual temperature of Mukura Forest is 15° C. The forest rises to an average height of 2600 meters above sea level, and receives 1500 mm of rainfall annually.

The reserve has about 163 species of birds.

References

Protected areas of Rwanda
Forest reserves